Ollerton is a town in the English county of Nottinghamshire.
New Ollerton is nearby

Additionally Ollerton can refer to the settlements of:
Ollerton, Cheshire
Ollerton, Shropshire
Ollerton Fold, Lancashire